Garthwaite may refer to:

Anna Maria Garthwaite (1688–1763), English textile designer
Oona Garthwaite, American singer-songwriter
Peter Garthwaite (1909–2001), English forester
Phil Garthwaite (born 1972), American broadcaster, farmer and politician
Rosie Garthwaite (born 1980), English journalist
Garthwaite baronets